Kızılibrik can refer to:

 Kızılibrik, Atkaracalar
 Kızılibrik, Ilgaz